Actor–observer asymmetry (also actor–observer bias) is a bias one makes when forming attributions about the behavior of others or themselves depending on whether they are an actor or an observer in a situation. When people judge their own behavior, they are more likely to attribute their actions to the particular situation than to their personality. However, when an observer is explaining the behavior of another person, they are more likely to attribute this behavior to the actors' personality rather than to situational factors.

Sometimes the actor-observer asymmetry is defined as the fundamental attribution error, which is when people tend to focus on the internal, personal characteristic or disposition as the cause of behavior rather than the external factors or situational influences.

This term falls under attribution theory. The specific hypothesis of an actor-observer asymmetry in attribution was originally proposed by Edward Jones and Richard Nisbett, where they said that "actors tend to attribute the causes of their behavior to stimuli inherent in the situation, while observers tend to attribute behavior to stable dispositions of the actor". Supported by initial evidence, the hypothesis was long held as firmly established. However, a meta-analysis of all the published tests of the hypothesis between 1971 and 2004 found that there was no actor-observer asymmetry of the sort that had been previously proposed. Malle interpreted this result not so much as proof that actors and observers explained behavior exactly the same way but as evidence that the original hypothesis was fundamentally flawed in the way it framed people's explanations of behavior as attributions to either stable dispositions or to the situation.

Considerations of actor-observer differences can be found in other disciplines as well, such as philosophy (e.g. privileged access, incorrigibility), management studies, artificial intelligence, semiotics, anthropology, and political science.

Background and initial formulation
The background of this hypothesis was in the 1960s, with social psychology's increasing interest in the cognitive mechanisms by which people make sense of their own and other people's behavior. This interest was instigated by Fritz Heider's book, The Psychology of Interpersonal Relations, and the research in its wake has become known as "attribution research" or "attribution theory."

The specific hypothesis of an "actor–observer asymmetry" was first proposed by social psychologists Jones and Nisbett in 1971. Jones and Nisbett hypothesized that these two roles (actors and observers) produce asymmetric explanations. Their research findings were that "there is pervasive tendency for actors to attribute their actions to situational requirements, whereas observers tend to attribute the same actions to stable personal dispositions". By this theory, a student who studies hard for an exam is likely to explain her own (the actor's) intensive studying by referring to the upcoming difficult exam (a situational factor), whereas other people (the observers) are likely to explain her studying by referring to her dispositions, such as being hardworking or ambitious.

Early evidence
Soon after the publication of the actor-observer hypothesis, numerous research studies tested its validity, most notably the first such test in 1973 by Nisbett et al. The authors found initial evidence for the hypothesis, and so did Storms, who also examined one possible explanation of the hypothesis: that actors explain their behaviors by reference to the situation because they attend to the situation (not to their own behaviors) whereas observers explain the actor's behavior by reference to the actor's dispositions because they attend to the actor's behavior (not to the situation). Based largely on this initial supporting evidence, the confidence in the hypothesis became uniformly high.

Recent evidence
Over 100 studies have been published since 1971 in which the hypothesis was put to further tests (often in the context of testing another hypothesis about causal attributions). Malle examined this entire literature in a meta-analysis, which is a robust way of identifying consistent patterns of evidence regarding a given hypothesis across a broad set of studies. The result of this analysis was that, across 170 individual tests, the asymmetry practically did not exist. (The average effect sizes, computed in several accepted ways, ranged from d = -0.016 to d = 0.095; corrected for publication bias, the average effect size was 0.) Under circumscribed conditions (i.e. if the actor was portrayed as highly idiosyncratic, or in negative events), it could sometimes be found, but under other conditions, the opposite was found. The conclusion was that the widely held assumption of an actor-observer asymmetry was false.

Related but distinct concepts

Self-serving bias
The actor-observer asymmetry is often confused with the hypothesis of a self-serving bias in attribution — the claim that people choose explanations in a strategic way so as to make themselves appear in a more positive light. The important difference between the two hypotheses is that the assumed actor-observer asymmetry is expected to hold for all events and behaviors (whether they are positive or negative) and require a specific comparison between actor explanations and observer explanations. The self-serving bias is often formulated as a complete reversal in actors' and observers' explanation tendencies as a function of positive or negative events. In traditional attribution terms, this means that for positive events (e.g., getting an A on an exam), actors will select explanations that refer to their own dispositions, (e.g., "I am smart") whereas observers will select explanations that refer to the actor's situation (e.g., "The test was easy"); however, for negative events (e.g., receiving an F on the exam), actors will select explanations that refer to the situation, (e.g., "The test was impossibly hard") whereas observers will select explanations that refer to the actor's dispositions (e.g., "She is not smart enough").

Positivity bias
The actor-observer asymmetry can seem similar to the hypothesis of a positivity bias in attribution - the claim that people are biased toward favorable evaluations. This hypothesis states that people will attribute their behavior with positive consequences to internal factors and their behavior with negative consequences to external factors. The positivity bias is described in terms of the actors attributions of their own behavior. This means that people will attribute their behavior which received a positive consequence (passes their driving test and receiving their drivers' license) to an internal factor (I really know the material). However, people will attribute their behavior in which they received a negative consequence (failing a driving test) to an external factor (the sun was in my eyes).

Correspondence bias

Observers attribute actions of others to their future behavior. Witnessing one's actions brings the witness to attribute those same actions to that person's future behavior. This explains why first impressions are so important to us. Once an action is seen, it is hard for the observer to imagine any other differing behaviors from the actor. However, on the other hand, it is hard for actors to attribute one action they have made to their whole behavior. They view themselves as more responsive, and therefore believe themselves to be in control of all situational matters. As the actor can attribute every action in the past he/she has done, the observer can only attribute the one action that is witnessed to that actor. Therefore, will attribute dispositional, rather than situational means to the actor.

See also

 Attribution (psychology)
 Fundamental attribution error
 List of biases in judgment and decision making
 Self-serving bias

References

Bibliography

 
Also available in: 

Cognitive biases
Asymmetry
Error
Causal fallacies